Cryptographie indéchiffrable (subtitle: basée sur de nouvelles combinaisons rationelles)  is a French book on cryptography written by Émile Victor Théodore Myszkowski (a retired French colonel) and published in 1902.

His book described a cipher that the author had invented and claimed (incorrectly) was "undecipherable" (i.e. secure against unauthorised attempts to read it). It was based on a form of repeated-key transposition.

See also
 Books on cryptography
 Transposition cipher

Cryptography books
1902 non-fiction books